Aluminium diacetate, also known as basic aluminium acetate, is a white powder with the chemical formula C4H7AlO5. It is one of a number of aluminium acetates and can be prepared in a reaction of sodium aluminate (NaAlO2) with acetic acid.

Medicinal use
Aluminium diacetate is used as an antiseptic and astringent. It is used topically as wet dressing, compress, or soak for self-medication to temporarily relieve itching and soothe, particularly on wet or weeping lesions. It relieves skin irritation from many causes, such as insect bites, athlete's foot, urushiol-induced contact dermatitis from plants poisonous to the touch such as poison ivy, oak, or sumac, and skin irritation due to sensitivity to soaps, detergents, cosmetics, or jewellery. It is also used to relieve swelling from bruises. Preparations are also used topically for the relief of a variety skin conditions such as eczema, diaper rash, acne, and pruritus ani. It is typically used in the form of Burow's solution, 13% of AlAc in water. In the USA medications containing aluminum acetate are sold under the brand names Domeboro Powder, Gordon's Boro-Packs, and Pedi-Boro Soak Paks. It is sold in gel form under the name TriCalm.

Acetic acid/aluminium acetate solution can be used medicinally to treat infections in the outer ear canal. This medication stops the growth of the bacteria and fungus and beneficially dries out the ear canal. US preparations for this purpose include Domeboro Otic, Star-Otic, and Borofair.

Mordant
In the dyeing industry, basic aluminium diacetate is used in combination with aluminium triacetate as a mordant for fibres like cotton.

References

Acetates
Aluminium compounds